The Cluj-Napoca Hungarian Opera is a public opera company in Cluj-Napoca, Romania, founded on 17 December 1948. It resides at the Hungarian Theatre of Cluj.

The structure was built during 1909–1910 on the site of an old summer theatre, and was reconstructed in 1959–1961. The ensemble can host up to 862 people.

References

External links

  
  

Buildings and structures in Cluj-Napoca
Romanian opera companies
Opera houses in Romania
Culture in Cluj-Napoca
Tourist attractions in Cluj-Napoca
Musical groups established in 1948
Theatres completed in 1910
Music venues completed in 1910
Arts organizations established in 1948